General Mohamud Haji Mohamed Barrow is a former Kenyan  military commander, and was Chief of General Staff of the Kenyan military and Commander Kenya Army.

Career
Mohamed was born to an ethnic Somali community in northeastern Kenya. His younger brother Hussein Maalim Mohamed was Kenya's Minister of State in the office of the presidency, the first Somali to be appointed to the cabinet.

He was Commander Kenya Army from 1979 to 1981. 

On 1 August 1982, Mohamed commanded Kenyan military and police forces in a successful suppression of a coup d'état attempt against then President of Kenya Daniel arap Moi. The putsch had been staged by a group of low-ranking military officers led by Senior Private Hezekiah Ochuka, who was later found guilty of five overt acts and sentenced to death by hanging.

Mohamed would remain the Chief of General Staff of the Kenya Defence Forces for the next ten years.

See also
Hussein Maalim Mohamed
Mohammed Hussein Ali

References

Living people
Ethnic Somali people
Kenyan people of Somali descent
Personnel of the Kenya Army
Year of birth missing (living people)